Arman Gohar Sirjan Football Club (Bashgah-e Futbal-e Ârman Gâher Sirjan) is an Iranian football club based in Sirjan, Iran who compete in Azadegan League.

The club was founded in 2016 as Jahad Nasr Sirjan Football Club. The club is owned and supported by Arman Gohar Sirjan company.

Players

First team squad

See also
 Hazfi Cup
 2018–19 Iran Football's 2nd Division

References

Football clubs in Iran
Association football clubs established in 2016
2016 establishments in Iran
Sport in Kerman Province